Bourg-Saint-Christophe is a commune in the Ain department in eastern France.

It is located between the towns of Meximieux, Pérouges, and Béligneux.

Population

See also
Communes of the Ain department

References

External links

Bourg-Saint-Christophe official website

Communes of Ain
Ain communes articles needing translation from French Wikipedia